Flames over Treasures (and also known as Flames on the Treasures), is a 1988 Romanian film produced by Romania Film and directed by Nicolae Margineanu from a script by Ion Agârbiceanu from Agârbiceanu's novel "Archangels." It concerns a gold mine in Romania reported to be haunted. It stars Mircea Albulescu, Claudiu Bleonț, Magda Catone, Remus Margineanu, Imola Gaspar, Valentin Uritescu and Melania Ursu. 

Flacăra pe Comori won the Prize for Direction at the Romanian National Film Festival, Costinesti, 1987. The film is released in the United States on DVD and VHS by Ager Film, a company dedicated to releasing Romanian films for home video.

Cast
 Mircea Albulescu
 Claudiu Bleont
 Magda Catone
 Viorel Ludușan
 Remus Mărgineanu
 Vasile Nițulescu
 Claudiu Oblea
 Valentin Uritescu
 Melania Ursu

External links
 
 Flacăra pe Comori - Official site from Ager Film

1988 films
1988 drama films
Romanian drama films
1980s Romanian-language films